Ryo Song-hui (born 15 January 1994) is a North Korean ice hockey player. She competed in the 2018 Winter Olympics.

References

1994 births
Living people
Ice hockey players at the 2018 Winter Olympics
North Korean women's ice hockey forwards
Olympic ice hockey players of North Korea
Winter Olympics competitors for Korea